Gouverneur Island is a low rocky island  west-southwest of Petrel Island and  east of Cape Géodésie in the southern part of the Géologie Archipelago, Antarctica. It was photographed from the air by Operation Highjump, 1946–47, and was charted and named by the French Antarctic Expedition under André F. Liotard, 1949–51. Liotard was the first man to encamp on the island and, as leader of the Expedition, also held the honorary post of governor.

See also 
 List of Antarctic and sub-Antarctic islands

References

Islands of Adélie Land